Sándor Ivády (May 1, 1903 in Budapest – December 21, 1998 in Vienna) was a Hungarian water polo player who competed in the 1928 Summer Olympics and  in the 1932 Summer Olympics.

In 1928, he was part of the Hungarian water polo team which won the silver medal. He played all four matches.

Four years later he won the gold medal with the Hungarian team. He played all three matches.

His father was Béla Ivády, a Hungarian politician and agriculture minister between 1931 and 1932.

See also
 Hungary men's Olympic water polo team records and statistics
 List of Olympic champions in men's water polo
 List of Olympic medalists in water polo (men)

References

External links
 

1903 births
1998 deaths
Hungarian male water polo players
Water polo players at the 1928 Summer Olympics
Water polo players at the 1932 Summer Olympics
Olympic gold medalists for Hungary in water polo
Olympic silver medalists for Hungary in water polo
Medalists at the 1932 Summer Olympics
Medalists at the 1928 Summer Olympics
Water polo players from Budapest
20th-century Hungarian people